The Ministry of Human Rights is a ministry responsible for monitoring human rights, and in particular women's rights in Somalia. The current Minister of Human Rights is Deeqa Yasin.

See also
 Agriculture in Somalia

References

Government ministries of Somalia
Ministries established in 2012
2012 establishments in Somalia